Oberea oculaticollis is a species of beetle in the family Cerambycidae. It was described by Thomas Say in 1824. It is known from North America.

References

Beetles described in 1824
oculaticollis